In mathematics, specifically in representation theory, the Frobenius formula, introduced by G. Frobenius, computes the characters of irreducible representations of the symmetric group Sn. Among the other applications, the formula can be used to derive the hook length formula.

Statement 

is the coefficient of the monomial  in the homogeneous polynomial

 

where  is the -th power sum.

which is 2. Similarly, if  (the class of a 3-cycle times an 1-cycle), then , given by

is −1.

Analogues
In , Arun Ram gives a q-analog of the Frobenius formula.

See also 
Representation theory of symmetric groups

References 

Macdonald, I. G. Symmetric functions and Hall polynomials. Second edition. Oxford Mathematical Monographs. Oxford Science Publications. The Clarendon Press, Oxford University Press, New York, 1995. x+475 pp.  

Representation theory